Easy Fortune Happy Life is a 2009 Taiwanese television series starring Lan Cheng Long, Chen Qiao En and Roy Qiu. It aired on TTV every Sunday night from June 7 to September 27, 2009 from 10:00-11:30 pm.

Cast
Lan Cheng Long as Yan Da Feng 嚴大風 (26)
Chen Qiao En (Joe Chen) as Xie Fu An 謝福安 (25)
Roy Qiu as Han Dong Jie 韓東杰 (25)
Jocelyn Wang as Jiang Zhen Zhen 江珍珍 (25)
Others
Chen Zi Xian (陳咨憲) as Xie Fu Jiu / Pi Dan 謝福久/皮蛋 (9, Fu An's younger brother)
Ding Qiang (丁強) as Yan Yun Gao / grandpa Wang Cai 嚴雲高/旺財爺爺 (80)
Lan Cheng Long as young Wang Cai (20)
Dong Zhi Cheng as Chairman Yan 嚴董士長 (48)
Wang Juan as Yan Feng Feng 嚴鳳鳳 (46, Yan Yang's mother)
Xiu Jie Kai as Yan Yang 嚴陽 (25, Da Feng's cousin)
Tan Ai Zhen as Huang Chun Xiang 黃春香 (80, Fu An's grandma)
Chen Qiao En as young Chun Xiang (20)
 as Lawyer Li
Hsia Ching Ting as Village Chief
Na Dou (納豆) as Pang Dai / Ru Hua 胖呆/如花
George Zhang as Ken
Ada Pan (潘慧如) as Kelly 凱莉
Huang Tai-an as taxi driver
Guo Shi Lun as A Pao 阿炮
Guan Yong (關勇) as uncle Da / Han's adoptive father 達叔
David Chao (趙正平) as A Bao 阿保 (uncle Da's son)
Du Shi Mei (杜詩梅) as Mrs. Wang 汪太太
Adriene Lin as veterinarian

Production Credits
Screenwriter: Chen Xin Yi, Sun Xiang Yun (孫向妘), Lu Yi Hua (陸亦華), Wang Yu Qi (王玉琪), Zou Wei Gang (鄒維剛), Jian You Ping (簡佑玶), Huang Ji Rou (黃繼柔), Hu Ning Yuan (胡寧遠)
Producer: Chen Yu Shan, Hu Jia Jun (胡佳君)
Director: Liu Jun Jie

Episode Ratings

Source: Chinatimes Showbiz

External links
SETTV
TTV

Taiwan Television original programming
2000s Taiwanese television series
2009 Taiwanese television series debuts
2009 Taiwanese television series endings
Taiwanese romance television series
Taiwanese drama television series